The list of shipwrecks in 1967 includes ships sunk, foundered, grounded, or otherwise lost during 1967.

January

1 January

2 January

4 January

8 January

9 January

10 January

11 January

13 January

15 January

17 January

19 January

21 January

23 January

25 January

Unknown date

February

6 February

17 February

21 February

23 February

27 February

28 February

Unknown date

March

8 March

12 March

14 March

15 March

17 March

18 March

20 March

22 March

23 March

24 March

27 March

29 March

31 March

April

11 April

16 April

18 April

28 April

May

4 May

6 May

16 May

19 May

24 May

25 May

June

2 June

5 June

6 June

7 June

8 June

9 June

10 June

11 June

14 June

15 June

16 June

17 June

19 June

23 June

24 June

26 June

Unknown date

July

1 July

3 July

5 July

6 July

11 July

12 July

13 July

14 July

17 July

18 July

20 July

21 July

23 July

26 July

31 July

August

2 August

10 August

11 August

13 August

14 August

20 August

22 August

24 August

26 August

27 August

29 August

September

4 September

5 September

6 September

10 September

13 September

15 September

16 September

18 September

19 September

20 September

21 September

October

5 October

9 October

10 October

12 October

16 October

17 October

18 October

20 October

21 October

24 October

Unknown date

November

3 November

5 November

6 November

11 November

14 November

16 November

21 November

22 November

23 November

30 November

December

1 December

3 December

6 December

7 December

8 December

12 December

13 December

15 December

16 December

19 December

20 December

21 December

23 December

29 December

30 December

31 December

Unknown date

References

See also 

1967
 
Ships